The 2003 World Archery Championships was the 42nd edition of the event. It was held in New York City, United States on 14–20 July 2003 and was organized by World Archery Federation (FITA).

Medals table

Medals summary

Recurve

Compound

References

External links
 World Archery website
 Complete results

 
World Championship
World Archery
World Archery Championships
International archery competitions hosted by the United States